Advances in Ecological Research is a peer-reviewed scientific journal that was established in 1962 and is published by Academic Press. It was originally published every two years, but began to be published annually starting with the fourth volume. As of 2004, two volumes are published per year. The first editor-in-chief was J. B. Cragg, while the current editors are David A. Bohan and Alex J. Dumbrell. Past editors include Guy Woodward. The journal covers all aspects of ecology.

Abstracting and indexing
The journal is abstracted and indexed in the Science Citation Index, The Zoological Record, and BIOSIS Previews. According to the Journal Citation Reports, the journal has a 2021 impact factor of 5.182.

References

External links
 

Ecology journals
Publications established in 1962
Annual journals
English-language journals
Academic Press academic journals